This is a list of settlements in Corinthia, Greece.

 Agioi Theodoroi
 Agionori
 Agios Ioannis
 Agios Vasileios
 Aidonia
 Ancient Corinth
 Angelokastro
 Ano Trikala
 Archaia Feneos
 Archaia Nemea
 Archaies Kleones
 Asprokampos
 Assos
 Athikia
 Bolati
 Bozikas
 Chalkeio
 Chelydoreo
 Chiliomodi
 Corinth
 Dafni
 Dendro
 Derveni
 Dimini
 Drosopigi
 Elliniko
 Ellinochori
 Evangelistria
 Evrostina
 Examilia
 Feneos
 Galataki
 Galatas
 Geliniatika
 Gonoussa
 Goura
 Isthmia
 Kaisari
 Kalianoi
 Kallithea
 Kamari
 Karya
 Kastania
 Kastraki
 Katakali
 Kato Assos
 Kato Dimini
 Kato Loutro
 Kato Synoikia Trikalon
 Kato Tarsos
 Kefalari
 Kiato
 Klenia
 Klimenti
 Kokkoni
 Korfiotissa
 Korfos
 Koutalas
 Koutsi
 Krines
 Kryoneri
 Kyllini
 Lafka
 Lagkadaiika
 Laliotis
 Lechaio
 Leonti
 Loutraki-Perachora
 Lygia
 Lykoporia
 Manna
 Mati
 Megas Valtos
 Melissi
 Mesi Synoikia Trikalon
 Mesino
 Mikros Valtos
 Mosia
 Moulki
 Nees Vrysoules
 Nemea
 Nerantza
 Panariti
 Panorama
 Paradeisi
 Pasi
 Pellini
 Perigiali
 Petri
 Pisia
 Pitsa
 Poulitsa
 Psari
 Pyrgos
 Rethi
 Riza
 Sarantapicho
 Sikyona
 Sofiana
 Sofiko
 Solomos
 Souli
 Soulinari
 Stefani
 Steno
 Stimagka
 Stomio
 Stylia
 Stymfalia 
 Sykia
 Tarsina
 Thalero
 Throfari
 Titani
 Velo
 Vochaiko
 Vrachati
 Xanthochori
 Xylokastro
 Xylokeriza
 Zemeno
 Zevgolateio

By municipality

See also
List of towns and villages in Greece

 
Corinthia